Interstate 29 (I-29) is a north–south Interstate Highway in the midwestern United States. In the state of South Dakota, I-29 traverses on the eastern side of the state from the Iowa border near Sioux City to the North Dakota border near New Effington. On its route, I-29 passes through western portions of Sioux Falls, the state's largest city. It travels  in the state, the longest stretch of any of the four states through which it passes. I-229, the highway's lone auxiliary route in South Dakota, serves as a bypass around southern and eastern Sioux Falls.

Route description
The South Dakota section of I-29 is defined in South Dakota Consolidated Laws § 31-4-152. All of I-29 in South Dakota is included in the National Highway System, a system of highways important to the nation's defense, economy, and mobility. Average daily traffic volume on I-29 in South Dakota is relatively low by Interstate Highway standards. Most segments of I-29 outside of Sioux Falls receive between 5,000 and 20,000 vehicles per day, with numbers as high as 50,000 being reported in Sioux Falls.

Sioux City to Sioux Falls

I-29 crosses from Iowa into South Dakota at the Big Sioux River and enters the state in Union County. Exit 1, the highway's first exit in South Dakota, serves unincorporated Dakota Dunes. North Sioux City, the first city the highway enters in the state, can be accessed from exits 2 and 4. At exit 9 is the next community, Jefferson. Highway 105 (SD 105) formerly ran parallel to I-29, with southern terminus at exit 2 and northern terminus at exit 9. North of Jefferson, I-29 has a business loop in Elk Point. This business loop also serves the southern terminus of SD 11, a state route that runs parallel to I-29 through much of southern South Dakota. Farther north of Elk Point, the route runs northwest until its interchange with SD 50 at exit 26. This exit serves the cities of Vermillion and Yankton. After this exit, the highway curves north and heads for Beresford.  north at exit 31, the highway intersects SD 48. I-29 has one exit in Beresford, exit 47 serving SD 46, just after leaving Union County and entering Lincoln County. Beginning at exit 59, the highway runs concurrent with U.S. Route 18 (US 18). At exit 62, the concurrency with US 18 ends as US 18 branches to the east to serve Canton.

North of Canton, I-29 begins to serve suburbs of Sioux Falls. Exit 71 serves Harrisburg and exit 73 serves Tea.  north of the Tea interchange, the Interstate enters Sioux Falls, the largest city in South Dakota. The highway has eight exits in Sioux Falls. The first exit in the city serves I-229, a short auxiliary route that circles through the southern and eastern portions of the city. Just north of this interchange, I-29 enters Minnehaha County, the most populous county in South Dakota. At exit 77, I-29 shares an interchange with 41st Street. A diverging-diamond interchange is to be constructed at this interchange, and will be completed in the summer of 2024.  At exit 79, the highway shares an interchange with SD 42, known as 12th Street. This exit, a single-point urban interchange, serves downtown Sioux Falls. Exit 81 serves Russell Street, which leads to the new Denny Sanford PREMIER Center and the Sioux Falls Arena. At exit 83, I-29 intersects SD 38, also known as 60th Street North, which serves the Sioux Falls Regional Airport. Just north of the Sioux Falls city limits at exits 84A and 84B, a cloverleaf interchange, I-29 reaches I-90, the only other two-digit Interstate in South Dakota. Exit 84A to I-90 east leads to the suburb of Brandon.  north of the interchange with I-90, the highway reaches exit 86, which serves Renner and Crooks, the two northernmost suburbs of Sioux Falls.

Sioux Falls to North Dakota

After leaving the Sioux Falls area, I-29 continues north toward Brookings. The highway serves the EROS Data Center and United States Geological Survey near Baltic. The highway then continues north and intersects the northern terminus of SD 115 west of Dell Rapids. This is I-29's last exit before leaving Minnehaha County and entering Moody County. The highway continues due north to an interchange with SD 34 near Madison. The highway has a rest stop north of the Flandreau exit before entering Brookings County. The highway's first exit in Brookings County, serves SD 324. After this interchange, I-29 enters Brookings and has two exits in the city. The first is an interchange with US 14 at exit 132. This exit is also a signed business spur of I-29. Exit 133 serves the bypass route of US 14, signed as "US 14B". After these exits, the highway continues north toward Watertown.

Before leaving Brookings County and entering Deuel County, I-29 intersects SD 30. After this interchange, the highway turns northwest en route to Watertown. A past president of the Watertown Chamber of Commerce contacted C.L. Chase, a member of the Democratic National Committee, in an effort to get I-29 routed closer to Watertown. The effort was successful; the westward alignment became known locally as the Chase Bend. East of Castlewood, I-29 intersects SD 22 before entering Hamlin County. The highway has no exits in Hamlin County, as it travels for only  in the county, merely passing through the northeast corner of it before entering Codington County. The highway curves to the north  before its first exit in Codington County, which is exit 177, serving US 212 in the southeastern portion of Watertown.

I-29 intersects US 81 at exit 180, just northeast of Watertown, and the two routes become concurrent all the way to Manvel, North Dakota. Near the Codington–Grant county line, I-29 intersects SD 20. The highway has one exit in Grant County for Twin Brooks, though this road is not a signed highway. Entering Roberts County, I-29 has an interchange at Summit with US 12, for access to Aberdeen and Milbank. The highway heads northeast after this interchange. West of Wilmot, the highway intersects SD 15. Shortly after this exit, the highway turns to the north again. Just east of Sisseton, I-29 has an interchange with SD 10 then curves northeast. Near the small town of New Effington, the highway curves north and has its last exit in South Dakota at exit 246. This exit serves SD 127. North of this final exit, I-29 turns northeast and enters Richland County, North Dakota, next to the Dakota Magic Casino and Hotel resort. At the state border is a parclo interchange entirely on the North Dakota side serving the casino–hotel.

History
No freeway was originally designated between Sioux Falls and Fargo, North Dakota. In 1957, the segment of I-29 from Fargo to the Canadian border was considered for designation as Interstate 31 (I-31). However, in 1958, it was decided to connect the two Interstates between Sioux Falls and Fargo. The entire freeway from Kansas City, Missouri, to the Canadian border was then built and signed as I-29.

A  section between Worthing and SD 38 west of Sioux Falls was opened in October 1960. In September 1961, I-29 was extended across the Big Sioux River from Iowa to South Dakota. On April 1, 1962, some of the northbound directional spans collapsed into the Big Sioux River at the Iowa state line as a result of flooding and bridge scour. On September 30, 1962, an  section of I-29 between Sioux City and Sioux Falls was dedicated and opened to traffic.

By 1967, I-29 had been constructed from the Iowa border to the exit for SD 34. I-229, an auxiliary route for the highway bypassing Sioux Falls, was completed in 1962.

Future
By 2033, the South Dakota Department of Transportation (SDDOT) is planning to upgrade the interchange with I-229. SDDOT also plans to install an interchange with 85th Street in Sioux Falls, as well as a 69th Street overpass, turning a trumpet interchange into a redesigned tri-stack interchange.

Exit list

References

External links

29
 South Dakota
Transportation in Sioux Falls, South Dakota
Transportation in Union County, South Dakota
Transportation in Lincoln County, South Dakota
Transportation in Minnehaha County, South Dakota
Transportation in Moody County, South Dakota
Transportation in Brookings County, South Dakota
Transportation in Deuel County, South Dakota
Transportation in Hamlin County, South Dakota
Transportation in Codington County, South Dakota
Transportation in Grant County, South Dakota
Transportation in Roberts County, South Dakota